College of Liberal Arts may refer to, among other things, any of the following:

De La Salle University College of Liberal Arts
Georgia Institute of Technology Ivan Allen College of Liberal Arts
Kobe College of Liberal Arts
Korea University College of Liberal Arts
Massachusetts College of Liberal Arts
University of Minnesota College of Liberal Arts
College of Liberal Arts at the University of Nevada
Oregon State University College of Liberal Arts
Purdue University College of Liberal Arts
RIT College of Liberal Arts
Texas A&M College of Liberal Arts
Thomas More College of Liberal Arts
Towson University College of Liberal Arts
Shanghai University College of Liberal Arts

See also
College of Arts and Sciences
Liberal arts college